This is a list of the notable fountains in Naples, Italy. Naples has about sixty historical fountains and hundreds of smaller fountains.

Some fountains in Naples

Fontana del Carciofo
Fontana del Formiello
Fontana del Gigante
Fontana di Monteoliveto
Fontana del Nettuno
Fontana del Sebeto
Fontana della Sellaria
Fountain of the Spinacorona
Fontana dell'Esedra
Fontana di Santa Lucia
Fontana di Monteoliveto
Fontana della Tazza di Porfido
Fontana del Formiello
Fontana del Belvedere
Fontana della Sellaria
Fontana della Sirena Parthenope
Fontana della Duchessa
Fontana Gruppo Europa
Fontana del Leone
Fontana del Cortile delle Carozze
Fontana del Capone 
Fontana degli Incanti
Fontana del Capo Posillipo
Fontane Diaz
Fontana obelischi
Fontana di Oreste ed Elettra
Fontana di Castore e Polluce
Fontana del Ratto delle Sabine
Fontana del Marinaretto
Fontana della Scapigliata
Fontana della Maruzza
Fontana del Tritone 
Fontana della Flora Capitolina

Fountains in palaces, villas and cloisters

Fontana del Cervo
Fontana Spinelli
Fontana del Chiostro del Carmine Maggiore
Fontana del Chiostro di San Gregorio Armeno
Fontana di palazzo Castriota Scanderbeg
Small fountain (n.290 Posillipo street)

References

Fountains in Naples
Naples foutains
Naples